Mário Juliato (born May 21, 1944) is a Brazilian former football player and coach.

He started his professional career at Ponte Preta as a center back, but prematurely ended his career because of a seriously injured knee when he was 22. Then he started his managerial career working in youth teams of Ponte Preta. Later, Juliato managed São Paulo, Coritiba, Náutico, Portuguesa, Vitória, Fortaleza, Santa Cruz, Goiás, Ceará, Internacional, Maringá and CSA.

References

1944 births
Living people
Brazilian footballers
Brazilian football managers
São Paulo FC managers
Coritiba Foot Ball Club managers
Sport Club Internacional managers
Esporte Clube Vitória managers
Sport Club do Recife managers
Goiás Esporte Clube managers
Clube Náutico Capibaribe managers
Ceará Sporting Club managers
Paraná Clube managers
Association football central defenders